Sketches of Frank Gehry is a 2006 American documentary film directed by Sydney Pollack and produced by Ultan Guilfoyle, about the life and work of the Canadian-American architect Frank Gehry. The film was screened out of competition at the 2006 Cannes Film Festival. Pollack and Gehry had been friends and mutual admirers for years. The film features footage of various Gehry-designed buildings, including Anaheim Ice (the training rink of the Mighty Ducks of Anaheim), the Guggenheim Museum Bilbao, and the Walt Disney Concert Hall. It was the final film to be directed by Sydney Pollack before his death in 2008.

The film includes interviews with other noted figures, including:

 Charles Arnoldi
 Barry Diller
 Michael Eisner
 Hal Foster
 Bob Geldof
 Dennis Hopper
 Charles Jencks
 Philip Johnson
 Thomas Krens (former director of the Solomon R. Guggenheim Museum)
 Herbert Muschamp
 Michael Ovitz
 Robert Rauschenberg
 Edward Ruscha
 Esa-Pekka Salonen
 Julian Schnabel
 Dr Milton Wexler (Gehry's therapist)

The film also discusses work on Gehry's own residence, which was one of the first works that brought him to notoriety.

References

External links
 American Masters (PBS documentary series), page on Sketches of Frank Gehry
 New York Times Cast, Crew, Director and Awards page on Sketches of Frank Gehry
  Architecture Week 2007 RIBA Q&A session with Frank Gehry and Sydney Pollack about 'Sketches of Frank Gehry' (video)
 

Documentary films about architecture
2005 films
Sony Pictures Classics films
Films directed by Sydney Pollack
American Masters films
2000s English-language films
2000s American films